Xuantu Commandery was a commandery of the Chinese Han dynasty. It was one of Four Commanderies of Han, established in 107 BCE in the northern Korean Peninsula and part of the Liaodong Peninsula, after the Han dynasty conquered Wiman Joseon. Goguryeo rose in this area in competition with the Han dynasty over the region. Although Goguryeo gained full control over the general region in 302, the Eastern Han dynasty had already lost the earlier territory of Xuantu, which retreated to Liaodong Peninsula in the 1st century CE. The populations of the respective prefectures were greatly reduced after they were transferred to Liaodong, but their prefectural identities were preserved albeit nominally.

History
In 82 BCE, the Han dynasty reduced its commandery units; Lintun Commandery merged with Xuantu as a result. In 75 BCE, the Xuantu Commandery was forced to move its seat from Fort Okjeo (沃沮城) to Gaogouli County due to raids by the Maek tribes (貊), a likely reference to Gaogouli. As a result, some of its previous counties had now to be abandoned or reassigned, seven of which were subject to Lelang Commandery, the so-called "seven counties beyond the eastern pass" (嶺東七縣).

As a result of the change, only three counties remained under Xuantu Commandery: Gaogouli County, Shangyintai (上殷台) and Xigaima (西蓋馬).

The Book of Han records 45,006 households and 221,845 individuals in Xuantu Commandery for year 2 CE.

When General Sima Yi of Cao Wei conquered Gongsun Yuan in his military campaign against Liaodong in 238, there remained only four counties in the new Xuantu Commandery that had retreated west (present-day Fushun): Gaogouli, Gaoxian (高顯), Liaoyang (遼陽), and Wangping (望平). These would all fall within the influence of the fast-growing state of Goguryeo within the next century, and Goguryeo would end up ruling much of the previously Han-occupied part of the Northern Korean Peninsula.

Revisionism
In the North Korean academic community and some part of the South Korean academic community, the Han dynasty's annexation of parts of the Korean peninsula have been denied. Proponents of this revisionist theory claim that the Four Commandaries of Han actually existed outside of the Korean peninsula, and place them somewhere in Liaodong Commandery, China instead. According to this theory, the Xuantu Commandery was said to be located in Shenyang. 

These hypotheses are authoritative in the academic community of North Korea, which is supported by the amateur historical enthusiasts in South Korea, but this theory is not recognized at all in the academic circles of the United States, China and Japan.

Maps

See also
Four Commanderies of Han
Lelang Commandery
Lintun Commandery
Zhenfan Commandery
Daifang commandery
Canghai Commandery

References

Four Commanderies of Han
Three Kingdoms
1st-century BC establishments in China
Commanderies of the Jin dynasty (266–420)